Yevhen Volodymyrovych Banada (born 29 February 1992) is a Ukrainian professional footballer who plays as a midfielder for Kryvbas Kryvyi Rih.

Club career

Early years
Bananda is a product of the Donetsk city youth football system and Olimpik Donetsk.

Oleksandriya
His debut at professional level he made in 2011 for Oleksandriya.

Kryvbas Kryvyi Rih
On 14 July 2022 he signed for Kryvbas Kryvyi Rih.

International career
He was called up by manager Serhiy Kovalets for the squad of the Ukraine national under-21 football team to participate in the 2013 Commonwealth of Independent States Cup in Russia.

References

External links 
 
 

1992 births
Living people
Serhiy Bubka College of Olympic Reserve alumni
People from Nikopol, Ukraine
Ukrainian footballers
Ukraine under-21 international footballers
Association football midfielders
FC Oleksandriya players
FC Metalist Kharkiv players
FC Kryvbas Kryvyi Rih players
Ukrainian Premier League players
Ukrainian First League players
Sportspeople from Dnipropetrovsk Oblast
21st-century Ukrainian people